Andrea is a 1973 Argentine comedy film directed by Carlos Rinaldi, written by Ulises Petit de Murat and starring child actress Andrea Del Boca in the eponymous role. The film was scored by Tito Ribero.

Cast
Andrea Del Boca as Andrea
Ángel Magaña
Raúl Aubel
Julieta Magaña
Mario Passano
Paquita Más
Clever Dusseau

References

External links

1970s musical comedy films
1973 comedy films
Argentine musical comedy films
Films directed by Carlos Rinaldi
1970s Spanish-language films
1973 films